The Spotlight Newspapers  is made up of 3 weekly newspapers in the suburban communities in the Capital District of New York State. 
The group began in 1955 with The Spotlight.

History 
The Spotlight first appeared as a four-page penny saver in Delmar, New York on December 1, 1955.

It was founded by Mrs. Charles E. Walsh, Jr., (as she listed herself in the paper at the time) with its “offices” at a residential address on Roweland Avenue.

Tracy Walsh sold the paper to Robert G. King, a former Advertising salesman for the Times Union, in 1957. Nathaniel A. Boynton, a Slingerlands resident and former Associated Press writer, purchased the paper in 1975 and began a full-coverage news policy. Boynton stopped the free distribution of the paper and promoted subscription sales.

In 1980, Boynton sold the paper to Richard Ahlstrom, a retired vice-president of Westchester-Rockland Newspapers owned by Gannett. Ahlstrom turned The Spotlight into an 11- by 15-inch tabloid format, which allowed him to nearly double the news layout and photo content of the paper.

He also started the Colonie and Loudonville editions of The Spotlight.
Ahlstrom sold the papers to Eagle Newspapers in 1998, which formed Spotlight, LLC.

Spotlight, LLC expanded through purchases of existing newspapers and start-ups in areas without local newspapers to its present 12 weekly newspapers in just by 2007. Papers in Rotterdam, NY, Niskayuna, Scotia-Glenville, Clifton Park Guilderland, Burnt Hills, NY, Malta, NY, Milton and the City of Saratoga Springs sprang up in rapid succession.

The group also began publishing two monthly publications, Capital District Parent Pages and Capital District Senior Spotlight.

On October 1, 2009, Spotlight Newspapers and its parent company Eagle Newspapers were sold to Community Media Group, LLC. Community Media Group is a New York-based company with local ownership.

The Spotlight has always been a local news source. Reviewing early copies doesn’t give a true picture of the changing larger world. John F. Kennedy’s 1963 assassination received a heartfelt, but scant four-inch editorial.

In the 1950s, ’60s, ’70s, and ’80s, there was little or no coverage of the struggle for civil rights, of the Vietnam War protests, of the American hostages held in Iran, or of nuclear power plant protests, but there was coverage of the Lion’s Club pancake suppers, the Bethlehem Snow Queen competition, and the Voorheesville Dionysians’ latest theatrical offerings.

In fairness, for the first three decades, The Spotlight had no paid editorial staff.
What it did show, and continues to show, is the local news which is important to the people in our towns. One of the earliest and widely read features is the letters to the editor.

Residents had the opportunity to make their views known, and they did not mince words. 
“Bethlehem residents can get fired up over issues,” said Opinion Pages Editor and former executive editor Susan Graves. “They have been writing letters to the editor about town issues almost since The Spotlight’s beginning.”

The earliest Spotlights struggled for form. As a penny saver, a full-page advertisement from Handy Dandy Cleaners on the front cover was standard and perfectly reasonable. Later, letters to the editor were often on the cover.

The paper was printing what the community fed it; sifting through announcements, press releases, and photos. As the years went by, and ownership changed hands, The Spotlight evolved and grew. Based on their backgrounds and area of expertise, each owner imparted a lasting legacy on the papers, which continue to be the voices of their communities.

While residents still turn to the spotlight to see who made the Dean’s List, and which former classmate got married, they also turn to the papers for detailed coverage of school board meetings, town board meetings, and important local budget votes.

Spotlight Newspapers continues to be a source for local news for Albany, Schenectady, and Saratoga Counties of New York State.

References

External links 
 Spotlight News
 Bethlehem Spotlight
 Colonie Spotlight
 Guilderland Spotlight
 Capital District Parent Pages
 Capital District Senior Spotlight

Newspapers published in New York (state)
Weekly newspaper companies of the United States